The goong is a large bossed gong of the Mnong people of central Vietnam. This is to be distinguished from a goong lũ (cồng đá) which is a lithophone. The goong may be played in a set of 9 gongs from large to small.

References

Vietnamese musical instruments
Tube zithers